The Joseph A. Woodbury House is a historic house in Greeley, Colorado. It was built in 1870 for Joseph A. Woodbury, a settler from Beverly, Massachusetts who built many houses in Greeley, including the Glazier House. It was designed in the Gothic Revival architectural style. It has been listed on the National Register of Historic Places since May 17, 1984.

References

Houses on the National Register of Historic Places in Colorado
National Register of Historic Places in Weld County, Colorado
Gothic Revival architecture in Colorado
Houses completed in 1870